Randolph Charles Scott (born January 31, 1959 in Decatur, Georgia) is a former American football linebacker in the National Football League. He played 7 seasons in the NFL for the Green Bay Packers and he played for Bear Bryant at Alabama.

External links
NFL.com player page

1959 births
Living people
People from Decatur, Georgia
Sportspeople from DeKalb County, Georgia
American football linebackers
Alabama Crimson Tide football players
Green Bay Packers players
National Football League replacement players